Shula may refer to:


People

Surname
Dave Shula (born 1959), American footballer and coach, son of Don
Don Shula (1930–2020), American footballer and coach, father of Dave and Mike
Mike Shula (born 1965), American footballer and coach, son of Don

Given name
Shula Hebden-Lloyd, née Shula Archer, fictional character in UK radio series The Archers
Shula Keshet (born 1959), Israeli activist and artist
Shula Kishik-Cohen (1917–2017), Israeli spy
Shula Marks (born 1938), South African historian

Other uses
Al-Shula, football club in Aden, Yemen

See also